World of Horror, also known by its Japanese title Kyōfu no Sekai, is a role-playing video game with a 1-bit pixel art style, inspired by the works of H. P. Lovecraft and Junji Ito. The game was created by Polish developer Paweł Koźmiński, and published by Ysbryd Games. It was released into early access on February 20, 2020 through Steam, GOG.com, and Microsoft Store. The full game is set be released in mid-2023 for existing macOS and Windows platforms, Nintendo Switch, PlayStation 4, and PlayStation 5.

The game takes place in the town of Shiokawa, Japan, where the player must explore various locations and fight otherworldly creatures in order to halt the apocalypse.

Gameplay 
World of Horror features turn-based combat where the player queues up actions and attacks to be used against hostile creatures, many of which are based on creatures from Japanese horror manga or urban legends, such as Kuchisake-onna. The game also incorporates adventure game and roguelike elements in its exploration and puzzle-solving.

Development 
The game's developer, Paweł Koźmiński (a.k.a. Panstasz) worked on the game part time in between his work as a dentist. All of the in-game artwork was designed using MS Paint, with additional writing provided by author Cassandra Khaw. Music was composed by ArcOfDream and Qwesta. There was interest to launch on consoles since 2020, and a release date was revealed during Nintendo's Indie World Showcase in November 2022.

Reception 
Jordan Devore of Destructoid called the game "a rare treat" and praised its modular format, as well as its "eerie chiptune soundtrack and rising tension during a long, hard-fought run", but also criticized its combat as becoming tedious over long sessions. Jenna Stoeber of Polygon called the game's horror "engaging", though she criticized the visuals as "mixed", and called navigating the interface "frustrating". According to Metacritic, World of Horror currently has "generally favorable reviews".

Notes

References 

Upcoming video games scheduled for 2023
Early access video games
2020s horror video games
Indie video games
MacOS games
Monochrome video games
Nintendo Switch games
PlayStation 4 games
PlayStation 5 games
Retro-style video games
Role-playing video games
Video games developed in Poland
Video games set in Japan
Video games set in the 1980s
Video games using procedural generation
Windows games